The Erdos Bronzeware Museum, also known as Ordos Bronze Museum, is a thematic museum integrating collection, display and research of "Erdos Bronzewares" (鄂尔多斯青铜器), located in the downtown center of Dongsheng District, Ordos City, Inner Mongolia.

Erdos Bronzeware Museum was opened in May 2006, with an exhibition hall area of more than 7000 square meters, and

Erdos Bronzeware Museum is the first museum in China dedicated to displaying the bronzes of ancient northern grassland nomads. It is a second-class national museum in China.

References

Museums established in 2006
Museums in Inner Mongolia
Buildings and structures in Inner Mongolia